John Connelly may refer to:
John Connelly (baseball) (?–2013), American college baseball coach
John Connelly (1910s footballer), English footballer
John Connelly (footballer, born 1938) (1938–2012), English footballer
John Connelly (historian), American historian
John Connelly (musician) (born 1962), front man and guitarist with band Nuclear Assault
John Connelly (prospector) (1860–1928), Australian prospector and mine owner
John E. Connelly (1925–2009), Pittsburgh casino and riverboat owner
John R. Connelly (1870–1940), U.S. Representative from Kansas

See also
John Connally (1917–1993), American politician
John Connolly (disambiguation)
John Conolly (disambiguation)